No Time is the fourth EP released by the American anarcho street punk band Defiance, released on Profane Existence in 1997.

Track listing 
A side
No Time - 4:18

B side
Your Country Is Shit - 3:22
Fight the Real Enemy - 2:55

Defiance (punk band) albums
1997 EPs